Eastern Man Alone is the second album by American jazz saxophonist Charles Tyler, which was recorded in 1967 and released on ESP-Disk.

Background
After recording his debut album, Tyler returned to Indianapolis to enroll at Indiana University, where he stayed until 1968. He studied primarily with David Baker, a trombonist-turned-cellist. During his studies, Tyler waxed Eastern Man Alone. In addition to Tyler's alto and Baker's cello, the instrumentation consist of bassists Brent McKesson and Kent Brinkley on three Tyler originals and Baker's "Le-Roi", also recorded on the 1961 album Together! with the Philly Joe Jones-Elvin Jones Ensemble. "Cha-Lacy's Out East" revisits a theme from his first album.

Reception

In his review for AllMusic, Scott Yanow states "This is a worthy effort that is innovative in its own way although not recommended to listeners who feel that bebop is 'modern jazz'." The JazzTimes review by Lyn Horton claims "His music is seminal, even more so it seems than either Coltrane’s and Coleman’s was, because it is downright raw."

Track listing
All compositions by Charles Tyler except as indicated
 "Cha-Lacy's Out East" – 12:24
 "Man Alone" – 12:02
 "Le-Roi" (David Baker) – 13:00 
 "Eastern" – 10:56

Personnel
Charles Tyler – alto sax
David Baker – cello
Kent Brinkley – bass
Brent McKesson – bass

References

1967 albums
Charles Tyler (musician) albums
ESP-Disk albums